Al-Kadir (also spelled al-Kader) is a village in eastern Syria, administratively part of the Homs Governorate. It is located in the Syrian Desert with the Euphrates River to the northeast, the nearby village of al-Kawm to the south and Deir ez-Zor to the east. According to the Central Bureau of Statistics (CBS), al-Kadir had a population of 694 in the 2004 census.

Syrian Civil War
ISIL captured Al-Kadir as a part of their expansion into Syria in 2014. The town was liberated by Syrian Army forces on the 15 August 2017.

References

Populated places in Tadmur District